Miroslav Zei (25 July 1914 – 2 November 2006) was a Slovene biologist, specialist in marine biology, oceanography and ichthyology.

Zei was born in Nabrežina near Trieste in 1914. He studied Biology at the University of Ljubljana from 1932 to 1936. He specialized at the Oceanographic Institute in Split from 1937 to 1941 where he was also an assistant until 1941 and then senior scientific researcher until 1948 when he was appointed professor at the University of Ljubljana. He lectured until 1962 and then joined a United Nations FAO oceanographic project and worked in Ghana, Tunisia and the Western African coast from Morocco to Zaire until 1975. He was then head of the Marine Biology Station in Piran run by the National Institute of Biology of the University of Ljubljana. He died in Drniš in Croatia in 2006.

He wrote numerous scientific texts but also a number of popular science books. He won the Levstik Award twice, in 1952 for his book Iz ribjega sveta (The World of Fish) and in 1957 for Iz življenja sesalcev (The Lives of Mammals).

The Miroslav Zei Award for outstanding scientific achievements in Biology bestowed by the Slovenian National Institute of Biology since 2010 are named after him.

Selected published works

 Življenje Jadrana (Life in the Adriatic), 1947
 Iz ribjega sveta (The World of Fish), 1951
 Jadranske girice (Picarels of the Adriatic), 1951
 Morja bogati zakladi (Rich Treasures of the Sea), 1956
 Pelagic Polychaetes of the Adriatic, 1956
 Morski svet (Marine World), 1956
 Iz življenja sesalcev (The Lives of Mammals), 1957
 Dvoživke in plazilci (Amphibians and Reptiles), 1958
 Zoologija (Zoology), secondary school textbook, 1959
 Človek in ocean (Man and the Ocean), 1961
 Vretenčarji (Vertebrates), 1961
 Skrivnostna bitja globokega morja (Mysterious Creatures of the Deep Sea), 1962
 Morski ribji trg (The Sea Fish Market), 1982
 Jadranske ribe (Fish of the Adriatic), 1984
 Obrazi morja (Faces of the Sea), 1987
 Življenje živali v morju (The Life of Sea Animals), 1988
 Prvi koraki v morje (First Steps Into the Sea), 1998
 Povest o hrbtenici (The Story of the Spinal Cord), with Kazimir Tarman, 1999

References 

1914 births
2006 deaths
Slovenian biologists
Ichthyologists
Levstik Award laureates
University of Ljubljana alumni
Academic staff of the University of Ljubljana
Yugoslav zoologists